The 1901 Mississippi A&M Aggies football team represented the Mississippi Agricultural & Mechanical College—now known as Mississippi State University—as a member of the Southern Intercollegiate Athletic Association (SIAA) during the 1901 college football season. Led by L. B. Harvey in his first and only season as head coach, the Aggies compiled an overall record of 2–2–1 with a mark of 1–2 in conference play.

Schedule

References

Mississippi AandM
Mississippi State Bulldogs football seasons
Mississippi AandM Aggies football